Dennis Frank Pacey (28 September 1928 – 23 September 2009) was an English footballer who played as a striker, mainly for Leyton Orient, Millwall and Aldershot.

An ex-pupil of Strode's College, Pacey played for non-league sides Woking and Walton & Hersham before being signed by Leyton Orient in November 1951. He made his debut the following month in an FA Cup tie against Gorleston, and created an immediate impression by scoring a hat-trick in Orient's 5–4 win. He went on to break Orient's FA Cup goalscoring record, scoring 12 goals in all, a record which still stands as of 2011.

After three successful seasons, Pacey moved to Millwall and again scored on his debut. After scoring 36 goals in 132 league appearances for the Lions, he moved to Aldershot in September 1959, before moving back into non-league football.

Pacey later worked at Heathrow Airport before his retirement. He died in 2009, aged 80, after suffering an aneurysm outside a supermarket near his home in Chertsey.

References

1928 births
2009 deaths
Footballers from Feltham
English footballers
Association football forwards
Woking F.C. players
Walton & Hersham F.C. players
Leyton Orient F.C. players
Millwall F.C. players
Aldershot F.C. players
Dartford F.C. players
Yeovil Town F.C. players
English Football League players
People educated at Strode's Grammar School